Sidney Telles de Souza (born July 26, 1966) is a Brazilian sprinter. He competed in the men's 200 metres at the 1992 Summer Olympics.

References

1966 births
Living people
Brazilian male sprinters
Athletes (track and field) at the 1992 Summer Olympics
Olympic athletes of Brazil
20th-century Brazilian people